Heolgerrig (Welsh for "stony road"; formerly "Pen-yr-Heolgerrig") is a small village in Merthyr Tydfil County Borough, Wales. It is part of the community of Cyfarthfa.

It lies just west of Merthyr Tydfil, and is separated from it by the main A470 trunk road.

Village amenities include the Heolgerrig primary school, The Red Lion pub, The Heolgerrig Social Club, three chapels and a post office and small convenience store.

People from Heolgerrig

 Mike Jenkins (poet)
 Morgan Owen (poet)
 Richard Harrington (actor)

Notes

External links
Old Merthyr Tydfil: Heolgerrig - Historical Photographs of Heolgerrig, Merthyr Tydfil.

Villages in Merthyr Tydfil County Borough